Fiddler's Island is an island in the River Thames at Oxford in England. It is situated south of Port Meadow on the reach above Osney Lock.

The north part of the island sits between the River Thames and the top end of Castle Mill Stream, a Thames backwater. Fiddler's Island Stream flows to the east of the southern part of the island. To the south of the island, there is a short stretch of water known as the Sheepwash Channel linking back to the Castle Mill Stream and the Oxford Canal. The Thames Path runs the length of the complete island.  At the northern end, the island has a row of trees along it. On the Castle Mill Stream side there is extensive mooring. The rainbow-shaped Medley Footbridge crosses the main stream of the Thames to the west at the northern end and a flat iron Bailey bridge crosses Castle Mill Stream further south, linking it to Port Meadow to the east.  A small footbridge takes the Thames Path along the bank towards Osney Bridge. The northern part of Fiddler's Island is very thin. The southern part, connected by a footbridge, is wider. To the east is Cripley Meadow, largely consisting of allotments.

Fiddler's Island was authorised for public bathing by the Oxford City Council in 1852, probably the first place in Oxford to be approved by the council.

Gallery

See also
Islands in the River Thames

References

Islands of the River Thames
Geography of Oxford